Kyakhta Russian–Chinese Pidgin was a contact language (specifically a pidgin) used by Russian and Chinese traders to communicate during the 18th-early 20th century. The pidgin owes its name to the town of Kyakhta, a Russian town on the border with the Qing Empire's Outer Mongolia, which was the most important border trading point between the two regions for more than a century after its foundation in 1728.

Phonology
Due to the absence of consonant clusters in Chinese and their quite frequent occurrence in Russian, the need for epenthesis – adding additional sounds to words – arises to make pronunciation easier. Thus, the following transformations are typical:

In a number of words, the stop consonants [d] and [t] and the affricate [ts] transform to the fricative [z]:

Vocabulary 
Most of the words in the Kyakhta pidgin come from Russian. Many of them, in particular those that do not have consonants clusters, undergo no change; for example, воля ("will"),  люди ("people"), мало ("little"), надо ("it is necessary"), рубаха ("shirt"), сюда ("to here"), чужой ("alien"), шуба ("fur coat").

As a rule, pidgins have limited grammar and vocabulary. To compensate for this, words are often borrowed with additional meanings. In Kyakhta pidgin, for instance, the adverb мало, along with the meaning of "little" that it has in Russian, also means "not only"; посиди means not only "to seat", but also "to converse". An example of significant difference between the Russian meaning and the meaning in Kyakhta pidgin is the word  – it means "months" in Russian, but "forever" in the pidgin.

The predominantly colloquial origin of words is very noticeable. Many words are present in exclusively diminutive form:  ("woman") comes from Russian , the diminutive form of жена ("wife");  ("wine glass") comes from Russian рюмашка, the diminutive form of рюмка;  ("white") comes from Russian беленький, the diminutive form of белый.

Still, the influence of Mongolian is minimal.

The only significant contribution of Chinese to the vocabulary is the word  meaning "store, shop". Aside from that, Kyakhta pidgin contains several new compounds that could have been inspired by Chinese:
  ("madness") can be loosely translated to Russian as end-of-mind, it was used instead of Russian сумашествие
  ("hard-heartedness", literally "heart-awl") instead of Russian жестокосердие
  ("eloquence", literally "tongue-honey") instead of Russian красноречие.

Morphology 
Like most pidgins, Kyakhta pidgin lacks many morphological categories: there are no cases, numbers or gender of nouns.

Russian pidgins in general tend to have clear verb indications. In Kyakhta Pidgin, similarly to other Siberian pidgins, most verbs have ending -j/-i:  ("to be sick"),  ("to turn out"),  ("to bury"),  ("to drive"),  ("to be unaware"),  ("to scold"), ' ("to seat"). This ending makes verbs similar to the imperative form of Russian verbs: for example,  is the Russian verb болеть ("to be sick"), but in the imperative mood. We can speculate that such forms prevailed when Russians addressed their interlocutors.

During the late stages of the pidgin, the indicators of verb tenses appear:  indicates the past tense,  indicates the future tense,  indicates the present tense; for example,  means "to have walked",  means "to be walking",  means "will walk".

It is the only preposition present in the Kyakhta pidgin and it is used in the following way:  means "come to us" (приходи к нам in proper Russian),  means "in our store" (в нашем магазине in proper Russian).

This feature is shared with the Norwegian-Russian pidgin Russenorsk.

See also
 Mednyj Aleut language
 Russenorsk

References

External links

 Мусорин А. Ю.  Лексика кяхтинского пиджина // Функциональный анализ языковых единиц. Новосибирск, 2004. — С. 79-86. 
 Перехвальская Е. В. Сибирский пиджин (дальневосточный вариант). Формирование. История. Структура. Автореферат диссертации на соискание ученой степени доктора филологических наук. СПб., 2006. 
 Перехвальская, Елена Всеволодовна; Перехвальская Е. В. Русские пиджины. М.: Алетейя, 2008.  

Chinese-based pidgins and creoles
Russian-based pidgins and creoles
Mixed languages
Russian diaspora in China
Languages extinct in the 20th century
China–Russian Empire relations